White Knight is an Indian documentary film directed by Aarti Shrivastava. The subject is Chewang Norphel, a 78-year-old engineer in Leh, Ladakh, who, over the last 15 years, has invented and implemented a technology that is helping provide a solution to an ecological disaster created by climate change.

The film documents how Ladakh is grappling with an alarming water scarcity situation. In this high altitude desert where the melting of glaciers has been the traditional source of fresh water, a warmer planet is playing havoc with lifestyles and the ecology. With glaciers melting faster, fresh water is precious. Norphel's solution uses common sense and elementary observational science to create artificial glaciers.

Awards and recognitions
 Opening Film Water Doc Film Festival Canada 
 Official Selection Jaipur International Film Festival 2013 
 Official Selection South Asian Film Festival Canada 2012
 Official Selection Colorado Film Festival 2013 
 Special Mention Women Deliver Cinema Corner Conference

References

External links
 The Weekly Voice
 Real Screen
 My Bindi

Indian short documentary films
2012 short documentary films
Films directed by Aarti Shrivastava
Documentary films about global warming
Documentary films about water and the environment
Hari Om Entertainment films
2010s English-language films